Buffalo Gap is the name of several places in North America:

 Buffalo Gap, South Dakota
 Buffalo Gap, Texas
 Buffalo Gap, a mountain pass in Augusta County, Virginia
 Buffalo Gap, Saskatchewan
 Buffalo Gap High School, a public high school in Swoope, Virginia named for the nearby gap
 Buffalo Gap National Grassland, a national grassland in South Dakota